Belehzin-e Olya (also Romanized as Belehzīn-e ‘Olyā; also known as Bālāzīn-ye Bālā and Belezīn-e ‘Olyā) is a village in Badr Rural District, in the Central District of Ravansar County, Kermanshah Province, Iran. At the 2006 census, its population was 23, in 6 families.

References 

Populated places in Ravansar County